The word Honno can refer to several things, including:

Honno (publisher), Welsh women's press, established in 1986
Honnō  (Ringo Sheena song), a 1999 single by the Japanese singer Ringo Sheena
Lost Sex (Honno), a 1966 Japanese film

See also
 Honnō (disambiguation)